Jil Y. Creek (artistic name) (born in Vienna) is an Austrian guitar virtuoso. 
Best known as author of the guitar workshops “Jil’s Jam” in German Gitarre & Bass Magazine (since June 2006), and the workbooks “Creative Guitar” (published 2008 by Tunesday Records, Berlin, Germany), "Jil's Pentatonik Workshop für E-Gitarre" (2012, same publisher) and "Arpeggio-Workbook für E-Gitarre" (2018, same publisher). 
Besides her instrumental project, Creek has worked with German gothic acts Umbra et Imago and Lacrimosa as well as with a Frank Zappa cover band called S.W.N.B., led by Austrian legend Wickerl Adam (founder of the Hallucination Company), amongst others.

CD- and Videography 
 Reckless “Radio-Active”
 Sanguis et Cinis: “Madrigal”
 Lacrimosa: “Lichtgestalt” from “Musikkurzfilme – The Video Collection”

References 

 Mayones Guitars & Basses

External links 
Jil Y. Creek website

Living people
Year of birth missing (living people)
Austrian guitarists
Austrian women writers
Women guitarists
Musicians from Vienna